Iraq Suwaydan was a Palestinian Arab village located  northeast of Gaza City. It was captured by Israeli forces in Operation Yoav against the defending Egyptian Army during the 1948 Arab-Israeli War. The village infrastructure, with the exception of the police station built by the British Mandate authorities, was destroyed.

History
Archaeological excavations have found remains from the early Roman, Byzantine and Umayyad periods.

Ottoman Empire
Iraq Suwaydan, like all of Palestine was incorporated into the Ottoman Empire in 1517.  In the 1596 tax registers, Iraq Suwaydan was listed as an entirely Muslim village called "Iraq", located in the nahiya of Gazza, part of Gaza Sanjak, with a population of 45 families and 16 bachelors.  The inhabitants paid a fixed tax rate of 33.3% on agricultural products, including wheat, barley, summer crops, vineyards, fruit trees, sesame, goats and beehives, in addition to occasional revenues; a total of 5,000 akçe. 1/4 of the revenue went to a Waqf.

In 1838 Edward Robinson noted it on his travels in the area,
as a Muslim village in the Gaza district.

Socin found from an official Ottoman village list from about 1870 that Arak es-Sudan counted 29 houses and a population of 112, though the population count included men only.
Hartmann found that the village had 94 houses.

In 1883, the PEF's Survey of Western Palestine described it as a moderate-sized village situated on a plain.

British Mandate

In the 1922 census of Palestine, conducted by the British Mandate authorities, 'Eraq el-Suaiden had a population of 349 Muslims,
increasing in the 1931 census to 440, still all Muslims, in 81 houses.

In 1942, the villagers established an elementary school and in 1947 shared its facilities with the children of the neighboring villages, Ibdis and Bayt 'Affa. There were 104 students in the mid-1940s. The main crop was grain, with some almond trees and grapes.

In the 1945 statistics 'Iraq Suweidan had a population of 660, all Muslims, with a total of 7,529 dunams of land, according to an official land and population survey. Of this, 9 dunams were used for plantations and irrigable land, 7,329 for cereals,
while 35 dunams were built-up land.

Israel

On 12 May 1948, the British authorities withdrew, handing over the police fort to the Egyptian army, which then garrisoned it.
The fort controlled the road between al-Majdal and Bayt Jibrin as well as the main road to the Negev. The village was captured and destroyed during Operation Yoav. Eight Israeli attempts to capture the fort failed. It finally fell on 9 November 1948 after a massive bombardment including air strikes by B-17 Flying Fortress aircraft.

Following the war the area was incorporated into the State of Israel. In 1953 the moshav of Yad Natan was founded east of Iraq Suwaydan on village lands. In 1955 another moshav named Otzem was established on village lands to the southeast and in 1956, kibbutz Sde Yoav was established west of the site, close to village land.

In 1992, remains of houses could be seen in a eucalyptus grove that the Palestinian historian Walid Khalidi identified as the center of the village, along with cacti and remnants of a pool. Two roads, one passing through the village and the other leading to fields, were recognizable. The British police station, renamed Metzudat Yo'av, was still in use and the surrounding lands were cultivated by Israeli farmers.

See also
 Operation Shmone
 Depopulated Palestinian locations in Israel

References

Bibliography

 P. 42

External links
 Welcome to Iraq-Suwaydan
 Iraq Suwaydan, Zochrot
 Survey of Western Palestine, Map 20: IAA, Wikimedia commons

Arab villages depopulated during the 1948 Arab–Israeli War
District of Gaza
Tegart forts